The Big Five Marathon is a marathon race situated on the savannahs of South Africa. The race gets its name from the famous animals of Africa referred to as The Big Five Game: lion, leopard, elephant, rhino and buffalo.
The course of The Big Five Marathon runs through the private game reserve Entabeni in the Limpopo Province, situated between Johannesburg and the Kruger National Park. Even though the course runs directly through a lion territory, safety problems will not be an issue as the route is watched by helicopters and armed rangers.
The course of the marathon is atypical for its magnificent savannah scenery among the wildlife of South Africa as well as for its toughness. Even though the marathon is taking place in the wintertime, the sun can be brutal on the open savannahs. In addition to this, the course will be ascending quite a lot from beginning to end.

History
The Big Five Marathon appeared for the first time in 2005, and has been held annually since then. 

In 2007 The Big Five Marathon was held on June 30. The overall winner was American Jerry Spears, who finished by 3:18:13, 24 minutes before the runner-up crossed the line. Among the women 45-year-old Lynn Biesheuvel, also from South Africa, was the fastest by 4:17:31.

In 2008, The Big Five Marathon happened on June 28. The winner of the marathon was 28-year-old Hylton Dunn from South Africa, who finished by 3:55:06. The fastest woman in the field was 32-year-old Canadian Heather White, who crossed the finish line after 4:42:42. In the half marathon distance, two South Africans took home the gold: Wihan Swanepoel (1:53:18) and Lynn Biesheuvel (2:03:48) won in the men's and women's contests, respectively.

The Big Five Marathon 2009 had the same male marathon winner as last year, South African Hylton Dunn, who even cut 25 minutes off his finish time from last year's and finished by 3:30:06. In the women's marathon field Australian Richeller Turner crossed the finish line as the first one after 4 hours, 43 minutes and 6 seconds of running. The half marathon winners were South African Wihan Swanepoel (1:44:20) and South African Kim Laxton (1:44:20). A total of 115 runners crossed the finish line in the two distances.

Past results
Key:

References

External links
Additional info on the official Big Five Marathon website

Marathons in South Africa
Athletics competitions in South Africa
Recurring sporting events established in 2005
Wheelchair marathons